Lucas Ramos Roggia (born 21 January 1991) is a Brazilian professional footballer who plays as a forward for Juventude.

Club career 
Roggia started his professional career with Internacional of Porto Alegre, making up a total two appearances in the Brasileirão and four in the Campeonato Gaúcho. In January 2012, he joined Italian Serie A side Milan on a loan deal. He made no appearances for the first team, instead playing for the Primavera (under-20) squad, before returning to Internacional in July, at the end of the loan spell.

Statistics 
As of 1 July 2012.

1Continental competitions include the Copa Libertadores and the UEFA Champions League.
2Other tournaments include the Campeonato Gaúcho.

Personal life 
In addition to his Brazilian citizenship, Roggia also holds an Italian passport.

References

External links 
 

1991 births
Living people
Sportspeople from Rio Grande do Sul
Brazilian people of Italian descent
Brazilian footballers
Association football forwards
Sport Club Internacional players
A.C. Milan players
Brazilian expatriate footballers
Expatriate footballers in Italy